Jermaine Johnson (born 25 June 1980) is a Jamaican professional footballer who plays for Tivoli Gardens of the Jamaica National Premier League. He started his career in his homeland with Tivoli Gardens, before coming to England, where he has played for Bolton Wanderers, Oldham Athletic, Bradford City and Sheffield Wednesday. Johnson has also won 73 caps for Jamaica.

Playing career

Early career
Johnson started his career at Tivoli Gardens before he came to England with Bolton Wanderers, making his debut during the 2001–02 season. He spent that season and the 2002–03 season at the club but started only ten games and came on as substitute in another nine but scored no goals. In August 2003, Johnson had a short loan spell with Yeovil Town but returned to Bolton without making an appearance due to an ankle injury. After his spell at the Reebok he moved to Oldham Athletic spending the next two seasons there making 34 appearances and eight as substitute scoring ten goals.

Bradford City
Johnson was signed by Bradford City manager Colin Todd on a one-year deal in June 2006 to join fellow Jamaican teammate Donovan Ricketts at Valley Parade. His debut came in the first game of the 2006–07 season at Bradford lost to Nottingham Forest. A week later he scored his first goal for Bradford to secure a 4–2 victory over Gillingham. Todd wanted to keep hold of Johnson, but after turning down an offer of £250,000 from Derby County, the club were forced to sell Johnson to Sheffield Wednesday before the end of the January transfer window. Johnson's last game in Bradford colours was in a 2–0 defeat to Yeovil Town when he was sent off after 81 minutes. Overall Johnson played 31 games, 27 in the league, scoring four goals for City.

Sheffield Wednesday
Sheffield Wednesday manager Brian Laws signed the Jamaican for a transfer fee in excess of £250,000 from Bradford City on 31 January 2007. Johnson had to face a three-game suspension when he arrived in Sheffield due to a red card he received in his last game for Bradford. He finally made his debut on 20 February 2007 away at Luton Town, showing glimpses of his skill, however he was substituted in the 80th minute and was unable to prevent Wednesday losing 3–2. Johnson added his first goal to his impressive performances scoring Wednesday's third goal in the 3–2 victory over Yorkshire rivals Leeds United on 3 March 2007 in the 54th minute. He was injured during his next game against Plymouth Argyle which combined with a bout of chicken pox prevented him starting for the team until the last game of the season against Norwich City. Johnson scored again to help the team win 3–2.

In December 2007, Championship rivals Queens Park Rangers made an offer for Johnson. It was turned down however as he was described as a "top asset" in the playing squad.

His first full season with the club was disrupted by injuries and suspensions, however he was still voted midfielder of the year by fans of the club.

Johnson was involved in an unusual incident during a derby match at home to Sheffield rivals Sheffield United on 19 October 2008 when he was shown a second yellow card, and subsequently a red card, after being substituted. This occurred after he reacted angrily to his substitution by kicking a water bottle into the home supporters.

Jermaine Johnson was promoted with Sheffield Wednesday in 2012.

On 9 July 2012, he signed a one-year extension with the club. He secured Wednesday's first win of the season on 21 August with an 89th-minute goal against Birmingham City to see Wednesday win 3–2. He added his second of the season the following Tuesday against Millwall F.C. After being out of favour for most of the season, he returned to the side against Bristol City and scored his 3rd of the season to put Wednesday in front and added his 4th and 5th just fourth days later on 6 April. This was his first league double for Sheffield Wednesday as he secured a crucial win against Blackburn Rovers, equalising against an early Blackburn penalty and scoring the winning goal with a great 25-yard strike in the 78th minute to give Wednesday a 3–2 win. Johnsons 6th of the 2012/13 season came against Yorkshire Rivals Leeds United with a right-footed strike from the centre of the box, headed on from teammate Jérémy Hélan.

On 4 July 2013, he signed another one-year extension, continuing as the club's longest-serving current player. In May 2014, Johnson announced via Twitter that he was to leave Sheffield Wednesday.

Indy Eleven
Jermaine Johnson signed with Indy Eleven on 30-July-2014. He made his Indy debut from the bench against Atlanta Silverbacks on 2 Aug 2014. He was red carded in his second appearance against Fort Lauderdale Strikers four days later. The club declined to renew his contract at the end of the 2014 season.

International career
Johnson made his Jamaica national team debut in 2001.
He was again sent off four months later, this time for Jamaica in an international friendly against Nigeria at the New Den, in London. Johnson was involved in an altercation with Taye Taiwo, for which they were both shown a red card, but Johnson also appeared to push the linesman.

Johnson was recalled to the Jamaica squad in February 2013, making an appearance in their 0–0 draw with Mexico, his first appearance since November 2009, also Johnson made his appearance again as substitute against Panama in a 1–1 draw in a 2014 FIFA World Cup qualifiers match.

International goals
Scores and results list Jamaica's goal tally first.

Honours

Individual
 Football League Cup top assist provider: 2007–08 Had 4 goals

References

External links
Jermaine Johnson player profile at swfc.co.uk
Jermaine Johnson player profile at oldhamathletic.co.uk

1980 births
Living people
Sportspeople from Kingston, Jamaica
Association football wingers
Jamaica international footballers
Tivoli Gardens F.C. players
Jamaican expatriate footballers
Expatriate footballers in England
Expatriate soccer players in the United States
Jamaican footballers
Bolton Wanderers F.C. players
Yeovil Town F.C. players
Oldham Athletic A.F.C. players
Bradford City A.F.C. players
Sheffield Wednesday F.C. players
Indy Eleven players
Premier League players
English Football League players
North American Soccer League players
2005 CONCACAF Gold Cup players
2009 CONCACAF Gold Cup players
2017 CONCACAF Gold Cup players
National Premier League players